Antonio Bottis, C.R.S. (17 January 1618 – 1679) was a Roman Catholic prelate who served as Bishop of Minori (1670–1679).

Biography
Antonio Bottis was born in Genoa, Italy on 17 January 1618 and ordained a priest in the Ordo Clericorum Regularium a Somascha. On 17 November 1670, he was appointed during the papacy of Pope Clement X as Bishop of Minori. On 23 November 1670, he was consecrated bishop by Marcello Santacroce, Bishop of Tivoli, with Alessandro Crescenzi (cardinal), Bishop Emeritus of Bitonto, and Ulisse Orsini, Bishop of Ripatransone, serving as co-consecrators. He served as Bishop of Minori until his death in 1679.

References

External links and additional sources
 (for Chronology of Bishops) 
 (for Chronology of Bishops) 

17th-century Italian Roman Catholic bishops
Bishops appointed by Pope Clement X
1618 births
1679 deaths